Melville Clyde Kelly (August 4, 1883 – April 29, 1935) was a Republican member of the U.S. House of Representatives from Pennsylvania.

Biography
M. Clyde Kelly was born in Bloomfield, Muskingum County, Ohio. He attended Muskingum College in New Concord, Ohio. He was engaged in newspaper publishing at Braddock, Pennsylvania, in 1903 and established the Braddock Leader in 1904.

In 1907 he purchased the Daily News and the Evening Herald and consolidated them into the Daily News-Herald. He was a member of the Pennsylvania House of Representatives from 1910 to 1913.

Kelly was elected as a Republican to the Sixty-third Congress, but was an unsuccessful candidate in 1914. After his term in Congress, he continued his newspaper work. He was again elected as a Progressive to the Sixty-fifth and reelected as a Republican to the eight succeeding Congresses. He was an unsuccessful candidate for reelection in 1934.

During his tenure as Congressman, Clyde introduced a resolution to permit private contracting of airmail service. This resolution, the Air Mail Act of 1925 was signed into law on February 2, 1925, prompting many companies to venture into the aviation field (e.g., Boeing, Douglas, and Pratt & Whitney). The Airmail Act of 1925 was the foundation that commercial aviation is built upon.

After his time in Congress, he resumed his former business pursuits. He was accidentally shot while cleaning a rifle and died in a hospital at Punxsutawney, Pennsylvania. Clyde was interred in Mahoning Union Cemetery, near Marchand, Pennsylvania.

Sources 
 
 The Political Graveyard

References

External links
 

1883 births
1935 deaths
People from Muskingum County, Ohio
Muskingum University alumni
American newspaper publishers (people)
Republican Party members of the Pennsylvania House of Representatives
People from Allegheny County, Pennsylvania
Deaths by firearm in Pennsylvania
Accidental deaths in Pennsylvania
Pennsylvania Progressives (1912)
Firearm accident victims in the United States
Republican Party members of the United States House of Representatives from Pennsylvania
Progressive Party (1912) members of the United States House of Representatives
20th-century American politicians